Shira Elinav (born 26 April 2000) is an Israeli footballer who plays as a forward for US college team Kansas Jayhawks and the Israel women's national team.

Early life
Elinav was raised in Mazkeret Batya.

Career
Elinav has been capped for the Israel national team, appearing for the team during the UEFA Women's Euro 2021 qualifying cycle.

International goals

References

External links
 
 
 
 
 

2000 births
Living people
Israeli women's footballers
Women's association football forwards
Kansas Jayhawks women's soccer players
Israel women's international footballers
Jewish Israeli sportspeople
Israeli expatriate women's footballers
Israeli expatriate sportspeople  in the United States
Expatriate women's soccer players in the United States
Israeli twins
People from Mazkeret Batya